Shobdalpur Union is a union parishad situated at Sreepur Upazila,  in Magura District, Khulna Division of Bangladesh. There are 21 villages and 17 mouzas in the union.

References

External links
 

Unions of Khulna Division
Unions of Sreepur Upazila
Unions of Magura District